José Colomer Rivas (June 10, 1935 – January 24, 2013) was a field hockey player from Spain who won the bronze medal with the Men's National Team at the 1960 Summer Olympics in Rome, Italy.

References

External links
 
 
 

1935 births
2013 deaths
Spanish male field hockey players
Field hockey players from Catalonia
Olympic field hockey players of Spain
Olympic medalists in field hockey
Olympic bronze medalists for Spain
Field hockey players at the 1960 Summer Olympics
Field hockey players at the 1964 Summer Olympics
Field hockey players at the 1968 Summer Olympics
Medalists at the 1960 Summer Olympics
Sportspeople from Terrassa